The International Cake Exploration Societé (ICES) was founded in 1976 in Monroe, Michigan, USA by Betty Jo Steinman. The ICES is a nonprofit organization dedicated to preserving, advancing and encouraging exploration of the sugar arts. ICES also promotes and provides opportunities for continuing education, development of future sugar artists, and enjoyment of the art form.

Board of Directors and Executive Officers are elected by the membership at the time. Local Representatives are elected in each state, or appointed.

ICES holds an annual Convention and Sugar Art Show in a different location in the United States.

Certification 
ICES Certification Program aims to educate and encourage ICES members to develop their talents in the sugar arts, acquire new skills, and improve their standard of decorating. The Certification Program is available to any ICES member. Certification is a live, 8-hour, adjudicated test held in conjunction with the annual ICES Convention and Show.

Scholarships 
ICES awards one or more annual scholarships to applicants deemed most likely to develop and promote the art form.

Board of Directors (2017-2018)

Committees

Chapters 
The ICES has its branches in a number of states, such as: Colorado, Connecticut, Florida, Georgia, Illinois, Indiana, Massachusetts, Michigan, Missouri, North Carolina, Ohio, South Carolina, Tennessee, Texas, Virginia.

References

External links
 International Cake Exploration Societé - official site

Trade associations based in the United States
Sugar organizations
Baking industry